Philadelphia English is a variety or dialect of American English native to Philadelphia and extending into Philadelphia's metropolitan area throughout the Delaware Valley, including southeastern Pennsylvania, counties of northern Delaware (especially New Castle and Kent), the northern Eastern Shore of Maryland, and all of South Jersey, with the dialect being spoken in cities such as Wilmington, Atlantic City, Camden, Vineland, and Dover. Philadelphia English is one of the best-studied types of English, as Philadelphia's University of Pennsylvania is the home institution of pioneering sociolinguist William Labov. Philadelphia English shares certain features with New York City English and Midland American English, although it remains a distinct dialect of its own. Baltimore English is a closely related dialect, which exists on a geographic continuum with Philadelphia English and is prevalent in nearby Baltimore and its metropolitan area. Philadelphia and Baltimore accents together constitute what Labov describes as a single "Mid-Atlantic" regional dialect.

According to linguist Barbara Johnstone, migration patterns and geography affected the dialect's development, which was especially influenced by immigrants from Northern England, Scotland, and Northern Ireland. Today, an especially marked or "heavier" Philadelphia accent is most commonly found in working-class neighborhoods throughout the area, especially in Irish-American and Italian-American working-class neighborhoods, though the accent and dialect is prevalent and prominent to varying degrees throughout the entire region.

History
Philadelphia English has a complicated history, with speakers at times showing features shared with neighboring regions as well as uniquely local features. The Philadelphia and New York accents presumably shared certain common linguistic inputs in the nineteenth century, since both accents by the twentieth century demonstrated a high  vowel (which helps to maintain a contrast between words like cot and caught) as well as a phonemic split of the short a vowel,  (causing gas and gap to have different vowels sounds, for example) not found elsewhere in the United States. One important indicator of this is that Philadelphia's short a split appears to be a simplified variant of New York City's split. Unlike New York City English, however, most speakers of Philadelphia English have always used a rhotic accent (meaning that the r sound is never "dropped").

Philadelphians then began retreating from their longstanding New York City-like accent features after this point, and even further developed their own entirely unique phonological features. Next, higher-educated Philadelphians born in or since the last quarter of the twentieth century have been showing a process of dialect levelling towards unmarked Northern American English (General American English) features. This includes notable regularity among this demographic in replacing the traditional Philadelphia  split with the more General American tensing of  only before nasal consonants; this probably began around the time the first generation of this demographic attended college.

As of today, "the most strongly supported generalization is that Philadelphia has moved away from its Southern heritage in favor of a Northern system, avoiding those forms that are most saliently associated with local phonology". In the city of Philadelphia proper, the dialect has evolved further, especially among younger residents, and the "White Philadelphian dialect" is now spoken by a numerical minority of all Philadelphians within the city of Philadelphia itself, though it remains strong throughout the Philadelphia metropolitan region in general.

Linguistic features

Pronunciation

Vowels
The vowels in Philadelphia speech have shown volatility across the last century, as Labov's research has identified changes affecting over half of the vowel phonemes.

The raised variants often appear as diphthongs with a centering glide. As a result, Philadelphia is resistant to the cot–caught merger. Labov's research suggests that this pattern of raising is essentially complete in Philadelphia and seems no longer to be an active change.
 – split: Similarly, the single word "on" has the vowel of "dawn", and not the same vowel as "don". Labov et al. regard this phenomenon as occurring not just in the Mid-Atlantic region, but in all regions south of a geographic boundary that they identify as the "ON line", which is significant because it distinguishes most varieties of Northern American English (in which on and Don are rhymes) from most varieties of Midland and Southern American English (in which on and dawn are rhymes).
 Southeastern vowel fronting: One of the features that Philadelphia shares with dialects of the whole Southeastern United States (but absent from most New York accents) is the fronting of a variety of vowels. Generally, greater degrees of fronting are heard when the vowels appear in "free" positions (i.e., without a following consonant) than in "checked" positions (i.e., with a following consonant). Fronting does not occur in the context of following liquids leading to a significant difference between, e.g., goat and goal.
 Short-a split: As in New York and Baltimore accents, historical "short a" has split into two phonemes: lax  (as in bat) and tense  (as in bath). Their distribution in Philadelphia along with Baltimore, however, is different from that of New York City. Therefore, pass and passing use the tense , but passage and passive use the lax . There are exceptions, however; the three words bad, mad, and glad become tense, and irregular verbs ending in "-an" or "-am" remain lax. The words mad (tense) and sad (lax) do not rhyme in Philadelphia or Baltimore, but do for New York City and all other English dialects. (In the Trenton area, an intermediate system is used, falling between the typical Mid-Atlantic and the New York City system.) Not all Philadelphians today have this feature and some are beginning to favor the more General American tensing of short a only before nasals (especially under the influence of youth trends and higher education); in fact, as a general rule, native Philadelphians only consistently have this split system if their own parents are native Philadelphians.

 Mary–marry–merry three-way distinction: As in New York accents and most native English accents outside North America, there is a three-way distinction between Mary ~, marry , and merry ~. Labov, Ash, and Boberg (2006: 54) report that about one third of Philadelphia speakers have this merger, one third have a near-merger, and one third keep the two distinct. Relatedly, as in New York, many words like orange, Florida, and horrible have  before  rather than the  used in many other American dialects (See: Historic "short o" before intervocalic r).
Consequently, the diphthong in like may begin with a nucleus of mid or even higher position , which distinguishes it from the diphthong in line . Canadian raising in Philadelphia occurs before voiceless consonants, and it is extended to occur before some voiced consonants as well, including intervocalic voiced stops as in tiger and spider. Fruehwald argues that  has actually undergone a phonemic split in Philadelphia as a result of Canadian raising. The sociolinguistic evidence suggests this raising is a fairly recent addition to Philadelphia speech.
The recent sociolinguistic evidence indicates a reversal of this trend such that the vowel is now commonly raised and fronted. This raising is heard primarily before consonants (e.g., eat). The Linguistic Atlas researchers recorded lax variants of  near . This raising occurs before consonants (e.g., paid); in word-final position (pay),  remains lowered and lax. Both of these can lead to nonstandard phonemic incidence (see "Phonemic incidence" section). 
This pattern is not yet well established and is labeled by Labov as an "incipient" change.
In some cases, the vowel is in the high, back corner of the vowel space near . This is reportedly a recent development and is one more common among male speakers.

Consonants
 Philadelphia forms the core of the one fully rhotic major region of the traditional American East Coast. This area runs from Pennsylvania and southern New Jersey down to Delaware and northern Maryland, and remains fully r-pronouncing today.
Non-rhoticity (R-dropping) can be found in some areas of Philadelphia, however (presumably as a recent innovation after the nineteenth century) such as among working-class male speakers specifically from South Philadelphia, especially those born in the first half of the twentieth century and of Italian or Jewish descent. On the other side of the socioeconomic spectrum, non-rhoticity in speakers from the Philadelphia Main Line may be a result of wealthy families sending their children to expensive boarding schools in the United Kingdom up until the 1960s and thus acquiring a "Transatlantic" accent". Non-rhoticity is most prevalent among black Philadelphians, who largely do not demonstrate the regional speech features of Philadelphia English; instead, many black Philadelphians speak African-American Vernacular English.
Consonant changes, especially reductions and lenitions, are very common in informal conversational speech, so that:
Thus, the word streets might be pronounced "shtreets" .
 L-vocalization is quite pervasive in Philadelphia speech. Among Philadelphians, as in other dialects, vocalization occurs quite frequently in word-final and pre-consonantal contexts (e.g., mill, milk). In a more unusual development, vocalization may also occur inter-vocalically in Philadelphia. This tendency is more common when  appears following low vowels bearing primary word stress (e.g., hollow). This variable also shows some lexical conditioning, appearing, for example, with exceptionally high frequency in the pronunciation of the name of the city (Ash 1997). This, in part, leads to the stereotype of Philadelphia being pronounced as "Fluffya" or "Filelfia."
This variation appears to be a stable class-stratified feature with the non-fricative forms appearing more commonly in working-class speech.
 Consonant cluster reductions, such as removing the "t" sound from consonant clusters, so that "mustard" sounds more like "mussard," or "soft" like "sawff."

Phonemic incidence
 On is traditionally pronounced , phonemically matching the South and Midland varieties of American English (and unlike most New York accents), thus rhyming with dawn rather than don. However, the Northern  has also been reported.
 The word water is commonly pronounced  (with the first syllable rhyming with the word put, so that it sounds like "wooter" or "wooder"), rather than the more standard English . This is considered by many to be the defining characteristic of a Philadelphia dialect, even among young Philadelphians.
The word towel is commonly pronounced , like tal in the word tally.
 Both long-e and long-a sounds may be shortened before .
 In words like gratitude, beautiful, attitude, Baltimore, and prostitute, the i may be pronounced with the ee sound , as in bee.

Grammar
"Be done + noun phrase": The grammatical construction "be done something" means roughly "have/has finished something". For example, "I am done my homework" and "The dog is done dinner" are genuine sentences in this dialect, respectively meaning "I have finished my homework" and "The dog has finished dinner". Another example, "Let's start after you're done all the coffee", means "Let's start after you've finished all the coffee". This is not exactly the same as the standard construction "to be done with something", since "She is done the computer" can only mean "She is done with the computer" in one sense: "She has finished (building) the computer".

Lexicon
The interjection yo originated in the Philadelphia dialect among Italian American and African American youths. The word is commonly used as a greeting or a way to get someone's attention.

Many Philadelphians are known to use the expression "youse" both as second person plural and (rarely) second person singular pronoun, much like the mostly Southern / Western expression "y'all" or the Pittsburgh term "yinz". "Youse" or "youse guys" is common in many working class Northeastern U.S. areas, though it is often associated with Philadelphia especially. (ex: "Yiz want anything at the store?" "Yiz guys alright over there?").

Anymore is used as a positive polarity item, e.g. "Joey's hoagies taste different anymore." This sense of anymore is not specific to the region but is well represented there.

A sandwich consisting of a long bread filled with lunch meat, cheese, and lettuce, onion and tomato, variously called a "sub" or "submarine sandwich" in other parts of the United States, is called a hoagie. Olive oil, rather than mayonnaise, is used as a topping, and "hot" or "sweet" peppers are used for spice. The term 'hoagie' originated in Philadelphia.

A similar sandwich toasted in an oven or broiler is called a grinder.

Small chocolate or multi-colored confections sprinkled on ice cream and cake icing, elsewhere called sprinkles, are known as jimmies in the Philadelphia area, as well as in the Boston and Pittsburgh areas. (In Boston, and among some older Philadelphians, only chocolate sprinkles are called jimmies.)

Another distinctively Philadelphian word is jawn. According to Dan Nosowitz, jawn "...is an all-purpose noun, a stand-in for inanimate objects, abstract concepts, events, places, individual people, and groups of people."

Notable examples of native speakers

Lifelong speakers
The following well-known Philadelphians represent a sampling of those who have exhibited a Philadelphia accent:
Chuck Barris — "Barris' Philly accent"
Bob Brady — "a thick Philly accent."
David Brenner — "he never tried to dump his Philadelphia accent"
 Jim Cramer — "his pronounced Philly accent"
The Dead Milkmen — "meandering punk rock, and heavy Philly accents"
Tim Donaghy — Philly accent remains as thick
Johnny Dougherty — "thick Philadelphia accent"
Joan Jett — "her distinct Philadelphia accent & swagger"
Joe Kerrigan — "with his curt Philadelphia accent"
Jim Lynam — "speaks in a fast, choppy tone with a distinct Philadelphia accent."
Herb Magee — "Philadelphia University coach, whose accent, Irish mug, and hoops pedigree epitomize the hometown he's never left"
Bam Margera — "Not sure if you've heard the Philly patois? ...star Bam Margera, who is from nearby West Chester, has it."
Chris Matthews — "I don't think I ever realized I had a Philadelphia accent"
Mike Mayock — "With his thick Philly accent"
Katie McGinty — "McGinty intones in a Philadelphia accent."
Patrick Joseph Murphy — "Murphy hasn't lost his thick Philly accent"
Jimmy Pop of Bloodhound Gang — noted for singing in a  "Philly accent."
Kellyanne Conway  — of whom it was once observed that  "she's such a hoagiemouth that it's impossible to even say her name without sounding like you, too, speak hoagiemouth"

Lifelong non-rhotic South Philadelphia speakers
These speakers, primarily of Irish, Italian, or Jewish ethnicity, show the non-rhotic version of the Philadelphia accent local to South Philadelphia:
Joey Bishop — "an accent as thick as a porterhouse steak"
 David Brenner
Larry Fine — "mimic Fine's Philadelphia accent" 
William Guarnere and Edward "Babe" Heffron — "the old South Philly accent"
Dom Irrera — "distinctive Philadelphia accent"

Marginal speakers
These speakers retain slight traces or elements of a rhotic Philadelphia accent:
Gloria Allred — "slightly nasal, Philadelphia-accented voice that can drip with sarcasm"
Kevin Bacon and Bruce Willis — "two native [Philadelphia] sons, Bruce Willis (Salem County, N.J.) and Kevin Bacon (Center City Philadelphia), who, at least in interviews early in their career, before accent reduction training kicked in, let their diphthong freak flags fly."

Jill Biden — "She exaggerates her Philadelphia suburbs accent, which is already pretty strong."
Noam Chomsky — "I speak with the accent from a certain area in northeastern Philadelphia where I grew up."
Garrett "G. Love" Dutton — "a watered-down Philadelphian accent"
Tina Fey — "Pennsylvania-native Tina Fey showcased the accent"
Benjamin Netanyahu — "his Philly-flecked American English a vestige of his childhood years in suburban Cheltenham."

In media
Philadelphia English spoken by native speakers is seldom heard in films and fictional television shows. When PE is portrayed, many actors often mistakenly use a New York accent or simply substitute a General American accent. Films and television shows set in the Philadelphia region generally make the mistake of giving the characters a working-class New York dialect (specifically heard in Philadelphia-set films such as the Rocky series, Invincible, and A History of Violence). Contrary examples exist, such as the character Lynn Sear (played by Toni Collette) in The Sixth Sense, who speaks with an accurate Philadelphia dialect. In Sleepers, the character Sean Nokes (played by Philadelphia native Kevin Bacon) speaks in an exaggerated Philadelphia accent. The use of geographically inaccurate dialects is also true in films and television programs set in Atlantic City or any other region of South Jersey; the characters often use a supposed "Joisey" dialect, when in reality that New York-influenced dialect for New Jersey natives is almost always exclusive to the extreme northeastern region of the state nearest New York City.

The Philadelphia dialect is prominently featured in the 2021 television miniseries Mare of Easttown, set in Delaware County, Pennsylvania, adjacent to Philadelphia to the west and south. Reviews of the portrayal of the dialect by lead actress Kate Winslet and others have been mostly positive.

News media and reality TV 
Philadelphia natives who work in media and entertainment often assimilate to the General American broadcast standard. Speakers with a noticeable local accent include Jim Cramer, the host of CNBC's Mad Money, singer Joe Bonsall, political commentator Chris Matthews, Bam Margera, and several others in the MTV Jackass crew. Venezuelan American actress Sonya Smith, who was born in Philadelphia, speaks with a Philadelphia accent in both English and Venezuelan Spanish. Local television, political, and sports personalities in South Jersey and part of Central Jersey are culturally associated with Philadelphia, not New York City.

See also

 List of Philadelphia placename etymologies
Western Pennsylvania English
Pennsylvania Dutch English
Midland American English
American English regional vocabulary

Bibliography

 
 
 
 
 
 
  cf. Chapter 17.

Further reading

References

American English
Culture of Philadelphia
Languages of Pennsylvania
Languages of New Jersey
Delaware culture
American slang
City colloquials
Delaware Valley
Working-class culture in Pennsylvania